Ancylus ashangiensis is a species of very small, air-breathing, freshwater snail or limpet. It is an aquatic pulmonate gastropod in the Ancylidae family. This species is endemic to Ethiopia.

References

Planorbidae
Endemic fauna of Ethiopia
Gastropods described in 1965
Taxonomy articles created by Polbot